Yogi Adityanath: The Rise Of A Saffron Socialist is a biography on Uttar Pradesh chief minister Yogi Adityanath authored by The Times of India Resident Editor in Lucknow, Pravin Kumar. It traces the journey of transformation and evolvement of  Ajay Mohan Singh Bisht from Pauri in Uttarakhand to Yogi Adityanath of Goraksha Peeth in Gorakhpur, to the Parliament of India in New Delhi, and finally to the chief minister's post in Lucknow. The book is published by Times Group Books. The first copy of the book was presented to Yogi Adityanath on 24 November 2017. The book was released at the Times Literature Festival in New Delhi on 26 November 2017.

References

External links 
 

2017 non-fiction books
Indian biographies
Yogi Adityanath